Radičová's Cabinet was the government of Slovakia between 8 July 2010 and 4 April 2012 headed by the prime minister Iveta Radičová, who was the first woman in this office. The government was formed as a coalition of four parties – Slovak Democratic and Christian Union – Democratic Party,  Christian Democratic Movement, Freedom and Solidarity and Most–Híd.

Government ministers

Deputy Prime Ministers

External links
 Website of the Slovak Government

Government of Slovakia
Cabinets established in 2010
2010 establishments in Slovakia
2012 disestablishments in Slovakia
Cabinets disestablished in 2012
Slovak Democratic and Christian Union – Democratic Party
Freedom and Solidarity
Christian Democratic Movement
Slovak government cabinets